Santa Ana winds are strong seasonal winds in Southern California, United States, and northern Baja California, Mexico.

Santa Ana winds may also refer to:

Santa Ana Wind (song), 2012 song by Everclear
Santa Ana Winds (song), 1980 song by The Beach Boys
Santa Ana Winds FC, a soccer team in the United Premier Soccer League
Santa Ana Winds Youth Band, a marching band based in Orange County, California

See also
Santa Ana (disambiguation)
Santana (disambiguation)